The Head (Russian: Голова) is a 2003 Russian black comedy directed by Svetlana Baskova.

Plot 
A gangster performed by Sergey Pakhomov buys a magic Head. The Head fulfills all the wishes of the owner, gives him useful advice and spits money, having previously given him a blowjob. Following the advice of the Head, the gangster makes lucrative deals and exposes conspiracies against himself.

Throughout the film, the gangster tries to find a purpose in his life, constantly consulting with the Head, which secretly hates its owner. At the end of the film, a gangster kills the Head with a stick and becomes a monk.

Remake 
A remake of the film with the participation of the writer Arkady Davidowitz was planned, but it was canceled due to his death.

Awards 

 International Film Festival Rotterdam, Best Film 2004
 XIII Open Film Festival of the CIS and Baltic States, Kinoshock: "Cinema without film" contest, 2004
 Festival "Deboshir", St. Petersburg, 2004

References 

2000s Russian-language films
2003 films
2003 independent films
Russian black comedy films